Ole Kristian Temte (born September 23, 1975) is a rallycross driver from Krokstadelva, Norway. His racing career started in 2009, and he switched to supercars in 2015. He has competed in the RallyX Nordic Championship, the FIA World Rallycross Championship, and the European Rallycross Championship. Temte was a permanent driver in the European Rallycross Championship 2017.

History 
KNA-Eiker introduced rallycross to Temte in 2008 by asking him to drive in a race. He bought his first rallycross car, a Volvo 240.

Temte was out from racing for 11 months, and suffered a permanent damage to his left arm.

Temte has driven a Citroën C4 for supercars since 2015.

References

External links 

RallyX Nordic

World Rallycross Championship drivers
1975 births
Norwegian racing drivers
Living people
European Rallycross Championship drivers
People from Nedre Eiker
Sportspeople from Viken (county)